Datuk Matulidi Jusoh (5 July 1957 – 15 May 2015) was the Member of the Parliament of Malaysia for the Dungun constituency in Terengganu from 2008 to 2013, sitting as a member of the United Malays National Organisation (UMNO) party in the ruling Barisan Nasional coalition.

Matulidi was elected to Parliament in the 2008 election, replacing Rosli Mat Hassan as the Dungun's UMNO member. Rosli then replaced Matulidi as UMNO's nominee at the 2013 election and returned to Parliament. Matulidi instead contested the seat of Paka in the Terengganu State Assembly, but was defeated by Satiful Bahari Mamat of the Pan-Malaysian Islamic Party (PAS).

Death
Matulidi Jusoh died of diabetes on 15 May 2015 at 6 am, age 57.

Election results

Honours
  :
  Medallist of the Order of the Defender of the Realm (PPN) (2003)
  :
  Companion Class II of the Exalted Order of Malacca (DPSM) – Datuk (2011)

References

2015 deaths
1957 births
People from Terengganu
Members of the Dewan Rakyat
United Malays National Organisation politicians
Malaysian people of Malay descent
Malaysian Muslims
Medallists of the Order of the Defender of the Realm